Cosita Buena is the fifth album by Orishas, a Cuban hip hop group based in France. It was released on June 9, 2008 on the Universal Latino label.

Track listing
 "Cosita Buena" - 3:32
 "Maní" - 3:42
 "Bruja" - 3:39
 "Camina" - 3:45
 "Guajira" - 3:44
 "Borrón" - 3:33
 "Mírame" - 4:19
 "Que Quede Claro" - 4:09
 "Machete" - 3:21
 "Isi" - 4:13
 "Público" - 3:37
 "Melodías" - 3:49
 "Hip Hop Conga" - 3:56

References

Orishas (band) albums
2008 albums